, also known as simply The Lost Canvas, is a Japanese manga series written and illustrated by Shiori Teshirogi. It is a spin-off based on the manga series Saint Seiya, which was created, written and illustrated by Japanese author Masami Kurumada. The Lost Canvas was published by Akita Shoten in the Weekly Shōnen Champion magazine since August 24, 2006, concluding after 223 chapters on April 6, 2011, with twenty-five tankōbon released. Originally envisioned as a comic book whose purpose was to work simultaneously with Kurumada's Saint Seiya: Next Dimension as a multi-angle interpretation of the shared elements of its storyline, which stems from an event mentioned in Kurumada's original Saint Seiya manga; the approach was quickly abandoned, as both works greatly diverged, Kurumada's Next Dimension stayed as the canonical telling of these events, and The Lost Canvas as a separate alternate retelling.
The story takes place in the 18th century, and focuses on how an orphan known as Tenma becomes one of Athena's 88 warriors known as Saints and finds himself in a war fighting against his best friend Alone who is revealed to be the reincarnation of Athena's biggest enemy, the God Hades.

In June 2009, TMS Entertainment started adapting the manga in original video animation format, producing 26 episodes, which followed the source material closely and occasionally expanded on it. Teshirogi also started releasing a spin-off series from Lost Canvas two months after the main serialization ended. Titled , the spin-off focuses on short stories related to several Saints before the events described in the main series.

On April 23, 2012, it was announced in the Shōnen Champion magazine that The Lost Canvas was to change from a weekly to a monthly publication the following June, and shifting to the newly created magazine, Akita's Bessatsu Shōnen Champion, supplementary to Shōnen Champion, resuming publishing of the remaining Anecdotes chapters in that date.

In May 2013, TMS announced via its Twitter account that there were no plans for a third season for The Lost Canvas anime adaptation. Additionally, a special chapter of the manga was announced, to commemorate Kurumada's 40th anniversary as a manga artist.

Plot

Saint Seiya: The Lost Canvas tells the story of the previous Holy War, taking place in the 18th century, 250 years before the original series, in the Saint Seiya universe. The story centers on the fight between Tenma, one of the 88 Saints following Athena, and Alone, the reincarnation of the God Hades. While the two were close childhood friends in Italy alongside Alone's sister, Sasha, the trio separated. Sasha was sent first to the Sanctuary and then, a short time later, Tenma was sent to the Sanctuary too; while Tenma had the Cosmos, the Saints' energy, awaken, Sasha was revealed to be the reincarnation of Athena. As years passes, everything that Alone paints is destroyed, and he is convinced that death means salvation by the god Hypnos and his follower Pandora. Alone then gathers Hades' soldiers, the 108 Specters to start a war against Athena.

During the war, the Saints and the Specters face off. Tenma and Sasha have to deal with Alone who starts making the "Lost Canvas", a vast painting of the earth, in the sky, so that after he finishes it, the entire world will die. With Alone still not being fully controlled by the soul of Hades, Pandora, alongside Hypnos and his brother Thanatos lead the Specters. However, as the two Gods are sealed by the former Saints Pope Sage and his twin brother Altar Hakurei, Alone invites the few remaining Saints to the Demonic Temples located in the Lost Canvas. Once the Saints go through the Temples, it is revealed that Alone is not possessed by Hades and is instead using the god's powers for his own motives. Additionally, Tenma's parents, Mephistopheles Yōma and Owl Partita appear as Specters in the Temples to force their son to transform his protective Pegasus Bronze Cloth into the most powerful armour, God Cloth. With the God Cloth, Tenma and his future reincarnations will be able to fight the Gods and aid Athena in ending all wars.

Following several battles in the Temples, Tenma faces Alone one-on-one with the former managing to defeat the latter, causing the Lost Canvas' destruction. Shortly afterwards, Alone is possessed by Hades who aims to kill Athena. Hades is forced by the souls from the deceased Saints to escape to the last Demonic Temple, and Tenma, Sasha, and Alone decide to follow him. The three manage to defeat Hades but they never return to Earth. The two surviving Saints, Libra Dohko and Aries Shion, then prepare for a possible future war against Hades. Libra Dohko was assigned to permanently watch over the seal of Hades and 108 specters, while Aries Shion reconstructs and leads the Athena's Sanctuary.

Development
Shiori Teshirogi met Masami Kurumada in a public event she once visited during the time she was a new manga author. In such event, Teshirogi sent Kurumada the first manga she made as well as a letter which made Kurumada ask her to write The Lost Canvas. Although she was happy with such proposal due to the fact Saint Seiya has always been her favourite manga, she found troubles writing it since she used to write shōjo and Lost Canvas was meant to be from the genre shōnen. In order to do that, Teshirogi had to change various things from her style such as the narration and getting used to how to draw fights. Before the manga started, Kurumada sent Teshirogi a general version of the manga's story, but as long as the series continued, she started changing some parts after discussing with people from Akita Shoten. Additionally, the characters designs and Cloths were based on the second season from the Saint Seiya anime adaptation (known as Asgard), but she combined them with her own style. When Teshirogi was purposed to start The Lost Canvas she was informed that the series would last a few volumes. However, when the tenth volume was published, she was surprised by the series' length which she found amazing.

In the making of the series, emotions are what Teshirogi pays attention the most when she is drawing which makes remake several of the illustrations she makes. In both Saint Seiya and Lost Canvas, her favorite character is the Pegasus Saint, who has become the one she likes drawing the most. When creating Tenma, Lost Canvass Pegasus Saint, Teshirogi checked if Tenma's words would be like the ones from Seiya, but she realized that both characters had different personalities. The Cancer, Pisces and Taurus Gold Saints were developed with Teshirogi's idea of what she could do with the ones from the original series. When she received comments that these three Lost Canvas Gold Saints are more interesting than the ones from the original series, she answered that she did not mean to give them any special treatment. The characters' names are created according to their origins and constellation such as Pisces Albafica whose "Alba" portion of his name was developed when Teshirogi was thinking of roses' names.

Media

Manga

The Saint Seiya: The Lost Canvas chapters were published by Akita Shoten in the Weekly Shōnen Champion magazine since August 24, 2006. The first volume was published on December 12, 2006, and  twenty-five tankōbon collecting the work were released.

A short story comprised in 40 pages, or gaiden, titled  was published on October 16, 2009, in the issues 11 and 12 of Akita Shōten's Princess Gold comics magazine, which is oriented towards a female majority demographic. The story is set in the same continuity of Lost Canvas and further explores the past and motivations of the character Yuzuriha, and her younger brother Tokusa, as well as her perspective of the events surrounding the resurrection of Hades. This episode has yet to be included in a tankōbon compilation.

In the final chapter of The Lost Canvas, a new series of short stories focusing on the Gold Saints was announced. Simply titled  
, the first chapter was published on May 19, 2011.

OVAs

An original video animations (OVAs) series premiered in Japan on June 24, 2009. The production is by TMS Entertainment while Osamu Nabeshima is the director and Yoshiyuki Suga the writer. The first season comprises thirteen OVAs, each 30 minutes in length. All the OVA episodes were released on DVD and Blu-ray format by VAP. Season 1 ended on April 21, 2010, with the release of the eleventh, twelfth and thirteenth episodes. The second season premiered on February 23, 2011, adding thirteen more OVAs to the series. Season 2 ended on July 20, 2011, with the release of OVAs 24, 25, and 26. In January 2011, Crunchyroll announced they would stream the series on the United States, Canada, the United Kingdom, and Ireland. The original design was unveiled at the Tokyo International Anime Fair 2009. Discotek Media licensed the OVA series for a DVD release in North America and set a preliminary release date for November 24, 2015 but the release was delayed to December 8, 2015. In August 2018, it was revealed that VSI Los Angeles had been commissioned by Netflix to make an English dub for the series.

Currently, TMS confirmed it has no plans for resuming production of the OVA series, leaving a large portion of the original manga not adapted to animation.

Merchandise
The Lost Canvas has spawned a few merchandise items. Three CDs have been released, one with the opening and ending theme songs called "Realm of Athena" and "Hana no Kusari" respectively. The other CD contains the original soundtrack for the first season of the anime adaptation, released on September 25, 2009. Two characters from the series, Pegasus Tenma and Bennu Kagaho, have been released as part of  Bandai's Saint Seiya - Myth Cloth figure series. Other merchandise include a microfiber towel, a pocket mirror and two puzzles.

Opening & Ending Themes

Original Soundtrack I

Character Song

CD Drama Albafica Gaiden 
A CD Drama about one of Athena's Saints, Pisces Albafica has been released. The CD is currently only available to people that have purchased the first pressings of all 6 DVD or Blu-ray volumes of the Saint Seiya: The Lost Canvas animation. Only people in Japan are eligible to be sent the CD.

Artbook
An artbook named  was released on March 18, 2016, to coincide with the release of the final chapter of "The Lost Canvas: Anecdotes" serialization and the 10th anniversary of The Lost Canvas series.

Reception
During its first week, the volume 13 from the manga sold 25,238 copies in Japan. All the Gaiden volumes of Lost Canvas did not enter the top 30 best-selling manga in Japan. During its first week, the Lost Canvas Gaiden 2 sold 21,000 copies in Japan and stood on the 30th place of most sold manga in December 2011. During its first week, the Lost Canvas Gaiden 8 sold 24,000 copies in Japan and stood on the 44th place of most sold manga in August 2013.
During its first week, the Lost Canvas Gaiden 9 sold 19,100 copies in Japan and stood on the 48th place of most sold manga in December 2013.
During its first week, the Lost Canvas Gaiden 10 sold 22,000 copies in Japan and stood on the 47th place of most sold manga in June 2014.

According to a booklet that came along with the fifth Anecdotes volume, the twenty-five volumes of The Lost Canvas has sold about 6.7 million copies only in Japan (as of 2013).

The anime series has received generally positive reviews by anime critics. It has been praised for it being accessible to viewers who have no knowledge of the original Saint Seiya despite being a prequel, and at the same time it allows fans from the original to view events from a different point of view. While the use of characters was noted to be common within Japanese series in general, the delivery from various of them such as Tenma's and Alone's relationship was noted to be enjoyable. The animation was noted for standing out "beautifully" mostly in fights. Although the attacks performed by the character was found unintentionally funny by UK Anime Network as a result of its names, the notable display of violence made the reviewer wonder whether the show should be aimed towards a young audience.

In the interview with Nelson Akira Sato, president of the audiovisual distributor Sato Company, official distributor of The Lost Canvas in Brasil, confirmed that the original author, Masami Kurumada did not renew the rights with TMS Entertainment to continue with the animated adaptation of the manga.

References

External links
 Shiori Teshirogi's Blog 
 Official OVAs website 
 Official OVAs News Blog  
 Official VAP website  
 

2006 manga
2011 manga
2009 anime OVAs
Akita Shoten manga
Discotek Media
Classical mythology in popular culture
Lost Canvas
Shōnen manga
TMS Entertainment